Melvin Alonzo Cook (October 10, 1911 – October 12, 2000) was an American chemist, most known from his work in explosives, including the development of shaped charges and slurry explosives. Cook was a member of the Church of Jesus Christ of Latter-day Saints.

Biography
Born on October 10, 1911 in Garden City, Utah to Alonzo Laker Cook and Maude Osmond, he received a Master of Arts from the University of Utah in 1934 and a Ph.D. in physical chemistry from Yale University in 1937. He served as President of IRECO Chemicals (later acquired by Dyno Nobel). He also served as a Professor of Metallurgy and Mechanical Engineering at the University of Utah. He died on October 12, 2000 in Salt Lake City, Utah. He was related to the Osmond Family.

Family
His son, Merrill Cook, is a Utah politician who served as a U.S. Representative from 1997 to 2001.

Explosives
His career (which lasted over 50 years) in theoretical and practical explosives spans some remarkable achievements.  As an expert in explosives, Melvin was an investigator of the 1947 fertilizer explosion in Texas City, Texas.  The Texas City Disaster is considered the worst industrial accident in United States history.  In December 1956, he created a new blasting agent using a mixture of ammonium nitrate, aluminum powder and fuel oil, which was an unusual mixture at the time.  This explosive, the first of the so-called "slurry explosives" was remarkably safe. He did consulting work for the Iron Ore Company of Canada, where the aluminized ammonium nitrate slurry explosive (with water) he developed was successfully used.  His work on slurry explosives paved the way for the development of the BLU-82, nicknamed the "Daisy Cutter" (because of its use in Vietnam to clear helicopter landing zones), one of the largest and most powerful conventional bombs in the U.S. military inventory, using aluminized slurry.

Awards and recognitions
For his work in discovering slurry explosives, Cook received a Nitro Nobel Gold Medal in 1968, only the second time the award had been given (and which has been awarded only once since).  This award has sometimes been confused with the Nobel Prize conferred by the Nobel Foundation, but although it is given by the successor explosives company founded by Alfred Nobel, Nitro-Nobel AB (now a part of Dyno Nobel), it is not of the same stature or importance as the Nobel Prize.  Although it has been claimed that Cook was at one time a Nobel Prize nominee, he was never nominated.

Creationism
Dr. Cook was an ardent creationist, and his writings on the subject are frequently quoted or cited by creationists.  Cook was not, however, a "young earth" creationist, believing that "the creation was a refash[i]oning and reforming . . . of the surface features of the earth, not the earth as a whole" while "[t]he age of the earth turns out to be about half that claimed by geophysicists, but the solar system is found to be about the same as claimed by earth scientists."  In some of his work in this area of creation theory he provided arguments in favor of a 6000-year-old planetary surface.  One argument for a "young earth," which he wrote about in his book, Science and Mormonism, was that the atmosphere had not yet reached an equilibrium state with respect to carbon-14 creation/decay, and thus the atmosphere of Earth was in fact not older than 6000 years, although this has been debated.  He wrote an introduction to the 1954 book Man, His Origin and Destiny, by Joseph Fielding Smith.

Selected bibliography

Books
 Prehistory and Earth Models (1966)
 Science and Mormonism (1968, ASIN B00166NKK4) with his son, M. Garfield Cook.
 The Autobiography of Melvin A. Cook (1973 ASIN : B00070S6JK)
 Scientific Prehistory: A Sequel of Prehistory and Earth Models (1993, ASIN B002UQWY0Q)

Articles
 "Plasma and Universal Gravitation"  — From Appendix III, The Science of High Explosives — American Chemical Society Monograph Series No. 139 (1958)

Other frequently cited writings
 "What Happened to the Earth's Helium?" — New Scientist, Vol. 24, 3 December 1964, pp. 631–632
 "Where is the Earth's Radiogenic Helium?" — Nature, Vol. 179, 26 January 1957, p. 213

External sources
 Article on the BLU-82 at GlobalSecurity.org 
 Notation on The Melvin Cook Papers (1802–1989) at the University of Utah 
 TalkOrigins Archive article on a Melvin Cook claim 
 Who's Who in Creation/Evolution at ChristianAnswers.net 
 History of Dyno Nobel

References

1911 births
2000 deaths
American Christian creationists
American physical chemists
Latter Day Saints from Connecticut
University of Utah alumni
Yale Graduate School of Arts and Sciences alumni
Latter Day Saints from Utah